Federal Route 122, or Ketengah Highway and Jalan Jerangau-Jabor (Penghantar 5), is a major highway in Terengganu, Malaysia. "Ketengah" stands for "Lembaga Kemajuan Terengganu Tengah" or Central Terengganu Development Authority.

The Kilometre Zero of the Federal Route 122 starts at Paka.

At most sections, the Federal Route 122 was built under the JKR R5 road standard, allowing maximum speed limit of up to 90 km/h.

List of junctions and towns

References

Highways in Malaysia
Malaysian Federal Roads